Komron Tursunov (born 24 April 1996) is a Tajik professional footballer who plays as a forward for TRAU in the I-League.

Club career
In August 2019, Tursunov went on trial with Utrecht for two weeks, with Rosenborg also stating an interest in having Tursunov on trial.

Mohun Bagan
On 21 December 2019, Tursunov signed for Mohun Bagan, in the Hero I-League. Tursunov scored his first goal for the club against NEROCA FC at the Khuman Lampak Main Stadium. They clinched the league title that season.

TRAU
In 2020, he moved to another I-League side TRAU on a one-year deal. He scored six goals in 2020–21 season alongside league's fastest ever goal (9 seconds), as his team achieved third place.

Khujand
On 2 August 2021, Tursunov returned to the Tajikistan Higher League, signing for FK Khujand.

Rajasthan United
On 6 December 2021, Tursunov moved back to India and signed with newly promoted I-League club Rajasthan United FC on a season-long deal.

Churchill Brothers 
Tursunov moved to Churchill Brothers on 29 January 2022. He was signed as a replacement to Lebanese centre-back Shadi Skaf. He marked his debut for Churchill Brothers with an assist for a goal scored by Sekou Sylla against RoundGlass Punjab on 4 March. The match ended in a 2–2 draw. His first goal for the club came in the 2–1 win against Aizawl on 24 March, when he converted an assist from Kenneth Ikechukwu in the stoppage time of the first half. He scored again in the next game, against Sreenidi Deccan in a 1–1 draw. After failing to convert two easy chances, Tursunov scored in his third, his team's second goal in a 4–2 win, handing their NEROCA their first defeat of the season.

TRAU
In August 2022, Tursunov returned to TRAU after one year. On 18 August, he scored on his return debut in the Imphal Derby against NEROCA in the Durand Cup, which ended in a 3–1 loss.

International career
Tursunov made his senior international debut on 2 October 2018 against Nepal.

Career statistics

Club

International

Statistics accurate as of match played 1 June 2022

International goals
Scores and results list Tajikistan's goal tally first.

Honours
Istiklol
 Tajik League: 2018, 2019
 Tajik Cup: 2019
Tajik Supercup: 2019

Mohun Bagan
 I-League: 2019–20

Tajikistan
King's Cup: 2022
Bangabandhu Cup runner-up: 2018
Intercontinental Cup runner-up: 2019

References

External links
 
 
 Komron Tursunov at the-aiff.com

1996 births
Living people
Tajikistani footballers
Tajikistani expatriate footballers
Tajikistan international footballers
FC Istiklol players
TRAU FC players
Association football forwards
Tajikistan Higher League players
Expatriate footballers in India
Tajikistani expatriate sportspeople in India